is the name given to an HVDC back-to-back station for the interconnection of the power grids of western and eastern Japan. This facility went in service in March 1999. It operates with a voltage of 125 kV and can transfer a power up to 300 megawatts.  The station is located in Nanto, Toyama Prefecture.

External links
 http://www.meppi.com/mepssd/NPDF3/BTB_MinamiFukumitsu.pdf

Converter stations
Electric power infrastructure in Japan
Energy infrastructure completed in 1999
Nanto, Toyama
1999 establishments in Japan